The Pierson Farm near York, North Dakota is a farm that was developed in 1923. The farm was owned by Olaf Pierson, a Swedish immigrant. It was listed on the National Register of Historic Places in 1985.

References

Farms on the National Register of Historic Places in North Dakota
Buildings and structures completed in 1923
Swedish-American culture in North Dakota
National Register of Historic Places in Benson County, North Dakota
1923 establishments in North Dakota